U Know may refer to:

"U Know", a song by Prince from the album Art Official Age
"U Know", a song by Reks from Rhythmatic Eternal King Supreme
"U know", a song by Willow from her 2019 album Willow
Yunho, artist who performs under the stage name U-Know

See also
"You know", a phrase frequently used as a discourse marker